Saint-Beaulize is a commune in the Aveyron department in southern France. The nearest airport is Larzac, which is 7 miles away.

Population

See also
Communes of the Aveyron department

References

Communes of Aveyron
Aveyron communes articles needing translation from French Wikipedia